John Bennett Nichols III (September 28, 1931 – June 17, 2004) was a United States Navy aviator and author.

Biography
Raised in Hialeah, Florida, Nichols enlisted in the United States Army and served as a combat medic during the Korean War. After attending college he was accepted for NavCad training and commissioned in 1957. Originally he flew the North American FJ-4 Fury but shortly thereafter made the transition to the more advanced Vought F-8 Crusader, the last U.S. fighter designed with guns as its primary weapons system. This would be the aircraft that defined his professional career.

Nichols joined Fighter Squadron 62 (VF-62) and adopted the callsign "Pirate". During the Cuban Missile Crisis in October 1962, Nichols and pilots of VF-62 flew as escorts for classified RF-8 Crusader reconnaissance flights over Cuba to protect them from Cuban Air Force fighters. VF-62 was awarded the Navy Unit Commendation by President Kennedy. Nichols also became a landing signal officer as well as a flight and tactics instructor. In the latter capacity he was one of the founding members of the Naval Fighter Weapons School that evolved into "TOPGUN".

On his first combat deployment, assigned to VF-191, Nichols was wingman to LCDR Michael Estocin, who posthumously received the Medal of Honor for actions in April 1967.  On the following deployment Nichols destroyed one of two North Vietnamese MiG-17s that were attacking an RF-8 Crusader reconnaissance plane. Nichols shoot down of the attacking Mig Fighter saved the life of the reconnaissance pilot and was the final aerial victory to be won with guns in Naval history. For Gallantry in action, Nichols was awarded the Silver Star Medal. He later commanded VF-24 during the closing days of the war in 1973. At the end of his naval career, he was one of only five pilots to log over 3,000 hours in the demanding Crusader. Nichols flew over 350 combat missions during the war.

Upon retirement in 1975, Nichols returned to Florida and wrote occasionally. The first of his two books was a combination memoir and analysis titled On Yankee Station (1987). Warriors, a novel about an air war in the Middle East, was released shortly before Operation Desert Storm in 1990. Both were written with his friend Barrett Tillman.

On Yankee Station was well received in military aviation circles, and was added to the Air Force and Marine Corps professional reading lists.

Nichols returned to Florida and settled in Melbourne with his wife Jacqueline. There he died of cancer at age 72, survived his three children from a previous marriage, his wife, and two step daughters. Nichols is also survived by two brothers and two sisters

References

Further reading
On Yankee Station by John B. Nichols (with Barrett Tillman), Naval Institute Press, 1987, 
Warriors by John B. Nichols (with Barrett Tillman), Bantam Books, 1990, 
Fast Movers by John Darrell Sherwood, St. Martin's Press, 2001, 

1931 births
2004 deaths
United States Naval Aviators
United States Navy personnel of the Vietnam War
Deaths from cancer in Florida
20th-century American male writers